Sam Mfula Mwape (born 31 July 1983) is a Zambian long-distance runner. He competed in the men's 5000 metres at the 2000 Summer Olympics.

References

1983 births
Living people
Athletes (track and field) at the 2000 Summer Olympics
Zambian male long-distance runners
Olympic athletes of Zambia
Place of birth missing (living people)